Events from the year 1984 in Canada.

Incumbents

Crown 
 Monarch – Elizabeth II

Federal government 
 Governor General – Edward Schreyer (until May 14) then Jeanne Sauvé
 Prime Minister – Pierre Trudeau (until June 30) then John Turner (June 30 to September 17) then Brian Mulroney
 Chief Justice – Bora Laskin (Ontario) (until 18 April) then Brian Dickson (Manitoba)
 Parliament – 32nd (until 9 July) then 33rd (from November 5)

Provincial governments

Lieutenant governors 
Lieutenant Governor of Alberta – Francis Charles Lynch-Staunton  
Lieutenant Governor of British Columbia – Robert Gordon Rogers 
Lieutenant Governor of Manitoba – Pearl McGonigal 
Lieutenant Governor of New Brunswick – George Stanley 
Lieutenant Governor of Newfoundland – William Anthony Paddon 
Lieutenant Governor of Nova Scotia – John Elvin Shaffner (until February 1) then Alan Abraham 
Lieutenant Governor of Ontario – John Black Aird 
Lieutenant Governor of Prince Edward Island – Joseph Aubin Doiron 
Lieutenant Governor of Quebec – Jean-Pierre Côté (until March 28) then Gilles Lamontagne 
Lieutenant Governor of Saskatchewan – Frederick Johnson

Premiers 
Premier of Alberta – Peter Lougheed  
Premier of British Columbia – Bill Bennett 
Premier of Manitoba – Howard Pawley 
Premier of New Brunswick – Richard Hatfield
Premier of Newfoundland – Brian Peckford 
Premier of Nova Scotia – John Buchanan 
Premier of Ontario – Bill Davis 
Premier of Prince Edward Island – James Lee 
Premier of Quebec – René Lévesque
Premier of Saskatchewan – Grant Devine

Territorial governments

Commissioners 
 Commissioner of Yukon –  Douglas Bell
 Commissioner of Northwest Territories – John Havelock Parker

Premiers 
Premier of the Northwest Territories – George Braden then Richard Nerysoo
Premier of Yukon – Chris Pearson

Events

January to June
January 12 - Richard Nerysoo becomes government leader of the Northwest Territories, replacing George Braden.
February 29 - Pierre Trudeau announces he will retire as soon as the Liberal Party of Canada can elect another leader.
April 5 - A fire races through Number 26 Colliery located in Glace Bay on Cape Breton Island killing one miner. This effectively closes the mine permanently, ending years of coal mining in Glace Bay.
May 8 - Cpl. Denis Lortie enters the Quebec National Assembly and opens fire, killing 3 and wounding 13. René Jalbert, sergeant-at-arms of the assembly, succeeds in calming him, for which he will later receive the Cross of Valour.
June 30 - John Turner becomes Canada's seventeenth prime minister replacing the retiring Pierre Trudeau.

July to December
July 18 - Quebec actress Denise Morelle is found murdered in a house she had gone to visit Sanguinet Street in Montreal. Autopsies show that she was raped and brutally beaten to death. The murderer, 49-year-old Gaetan Bissonnette, will not be discovered until 2007.
August 31 - MuchMusic first airs.
September 1 - The Sports Network (TSN) first airs.
September 3 - In protest of the upcoming Papal visit, Thomas Bernard Brigham, a retired American armed forces officer, bombs Montreal's Central Station, killing 3 people and wounding more than 30.
September 4 - In the 1984 federal election, the incumbent government of the Liberal Party of Canada is defeated as the Progressive Conservative Party of Canada, led by Brian Mulroney, wins the largest parliamentary majority in Canadian history.
September 9–20 - Pope John Paul II tours Canada.
September 17 - Brian Mulroney is sworn in as Canada's eighteenth prime minister.
September 25 - The Premier of New Brunswick Richard Bennett Hatfield is accused of drug possession (35 grams of cannabis was found in his bag) during the official visit of Queen Elizabeth II in the province. He was finally acquitted.
October 5 - Marc Garneau becomes the first Canadian in space, aboard the Space Shuttle Challenger.
November 6
 Saskatchewan MLA Colin Thatcher is convicted of the murder of his ex-wife Joanne.
 Nova Scotia election: John Buchanan's Progressive Conservatives win a third consecutive majority.
November 23 - The Fredericton City Hall is designated a National Historic Site.

Full date unknown
 Labatt introduces the first twist-off cap on a reusable beer bottle.
 Telelatino Network signs on in October.

Arts and literature

New books
Neuromancer: William Gibson
La Détresse et l'enchantement: Gabrielle Roy
Dinner Along the Amazon: Timothy Findley
The Summer Tree: Guy Gavriel Kay

Awards
See 1984 Governor General's Awards for a complete list of winners and finalists for those awards.
Books in Canada First Novel Award: Heather Robertson, Willie
Gerald Lampert Award: Sandra Birdsell, Night Travellers and Jean McKay, Gone to Grass
Pat Lowther Award: Bronwen Wallace, Signs of the Former Tenant
Stephen Leacock Award: Gary Lautens, No Sex Please...We're Married
Vicky Metcalf Award: Bill Freeman

Film
James Cameron's The Terminator propels the Canadian director to international fame

Television
Jeopardy! is relaunched with Canadian Alex Trebek as host
Second City Television ends its run on Canadian television

Sport
May 19 – Edmonton Oilers win their first Stanley Cup defeating the New York Islanders 5 to 2. The deciding Game 5 was played at Northlands Coliseum in Edmonton. Edmonton's own Mark Messier was awarded the Conn Smythe Trophy
May 19 – Ottawa 67's win their first Memorial Cup by defeating the Kitchener Rangers 7 to 2. The final game was played at the Kitchener Memorial Auditorium in Kitchener, Ontario
August 12 – At the 1984 Summer Olympics held in Los Angeles Canada has its best performance ever, mostly due to the boycott of the games by the Eastern Bloc countries.
October 3 – Chicago Sting win their second Soccer Bowl by defeating the Toronto Blizzard  2 games to 0. The deciding game was played at Varsity Stadium in Toronto. This would be the final game played in the original North American Soccer League
November 18 – Winnipeg Blue Bombers win their eighth Grey Cup (and first since 1962) by defeating the Hamilton Tiger-Cats 47 to 17 in the 72nd Grey Cup played at Commonwealth Stadium in Edmonton. Edmonton's own Sean Kehoe is awarded the game's Most Valuable Canadian
November 24  – Guelph Gryphons win their first Vanier Cup by defeating the Mount Allison Mounties 22 to 13 in the 20th Vanier Cup played at Varsity Stadium in Toronto.

Births
 January 2 – Kristen Hager, film and television actress
 January 26 – Jon Hameister-Ries, football player (died 2021)
 February 8 – Manuel Osborne-Paradis, skier
 February 10 – Chris Pellini, canoeist
 February 15 – Mark de Jonge, canoeist
 March 13 – Noel Fisher, actor
 March 26 – Stéphanie Lapointe, singer-songwriter and actress
 April 25 – Dallas Soonias, volleyball player
 April 27 – Pierre-Marc Bouchard, ice hockey player
 May 7 – Kevin Owens, pro wrestler
 May 29 – James Steacy, hammer thrower
 June 2 – Max Boyer, wrestler
 June 13 – Chanelle Charron-Watson, swimmer
 June 16 – Rick Nash, ice hockey player
 June 27 – Kate Richardson, gymnast
 July 3 – Corey Sevier, actor 
 July 11 – Melanie Papalia, actress
 July 12 – Sami Zayn, pro wrestler
 July 20 – Nicholas Tritton, judoka
 July 24 – Tyler Kyte, actor and singer
 August 4 – Scott Dickens, swimmer
 August 6 – Kit Lang, actor
 September 5
 Marina Radu, water polo player
 Shawn Hook, singer-songwriter 
 September 19 – Kevin Zegers, actor
 September 22 – Laura Vandervoort, actress
 September 27 – Avril Lavigne, singer-songwriter, fashion designer and actress
 October 1 – Rosanna Tomiuk, water polo player
 October 4 – Sheray Thomas, basketball player
 October 11 – Martha MacIsaac, actress
 October 24 – Sultana Frizell, hammer thrower
 October 26 – Dominique Perreault, water polo player
 November 26 – Shannon Rempel, speed skater
 November 28 – Marc-André Fleury, ice hockey player
 December 21 – Sarah Mutch, model and actress

Deaths

January to June
February 7 – James Sinclair, politician, businessman and father of Margaret Sinclair, one-time wife of Prime Minister Pierre Trudeau, and grandfather of Justin Trudeau (born 1908)
February 9 – William Earl Rowe, politician and 20th Lieutenant Governor of Ontario (born 1894)
March 22 – Stanley Fox, politician (born 1906)
March 26 – Bora Laskin, jurist and 14th Chief Justice of Canada (born 1912)
March 30 – Gaëtan Dugas, early AIDS patient, the alleged and debunked Patient Zero for AIDS (born 1953)
April 11 – Adhémar Raynault, politician and Mayor of Montreal (born 1891)
May 17 – Gordon Sinclair, journalist, writer and commentator (born 1900)
May 19 – Russell Paulley, politician (born 1909)
May 30 – George Pearkes, politician, soldier and recipient of the Victoria Cross (born 1888)

July to December
July 17 – Denise Morelle, actress and murder victim (born 1926)
August 12 – Lenny Breau, guitarist (born 1941)
September 25 – Walter Pidgeon, actor (born 1897)
October 2 – Harry Strom, politician and 9th Premier of Alberta (born 1914)
October 19 – Grant Notley, politician (born 1939)
December 31 – Chester Ronning, diplomat and politician (born 1894)

See also
 1984 in Canadian television
 List of Canadian films of 1984

References

 
Years of the 20th century in Canada
Canada
1984 in North America